Hosťovce is a village and municipality in the Greater Košice District in the Kosice Region of eastern Slovakia. The village has a Hungarian population.

History
The village was first mentioned in historical records in 1360. From 1964 to 1990, together with the villages of Chorváty and Turnianska Nová Ves, Hosťovce was part of the village of Nová Bodva.

Geography
The village lies at an elevation of 171 meters and covers an area of 4.83 km². It has a population of about 195.

Genealogical resources

The records for genealogical research are available at the state archive "Statny Archiv in Kosice, Slovakia"

 Greek Catholic church records (births/marriages/deaths): 1760-1945 (parish B)
 Reformated church records (births/marriages/deaths): 1789-1931 (parish A)

See also
 List of municipalities and towns in Slovakia

External links

Surnames of living people in Hostovce

Villages and municipalities in Košice-okolie District